Portul Stadium is a multi-use stadium in Constanţa. It is the home ground of Portul Constanţa. It holds 10,000 people.

Football venues in Romania
Buildings and structures in Constanța